Robert Harrison (1796 – 23 April 1858) M.D., M.R.C.S.I., M.R.I.A. was the president of the Royal College of Surgeons in Ireland (RCSI) in 1848.

Robert Harrison was born in Cumberland in 1796 and he was sent to study at Trinity College Dublin, where he graduated in arts. He was indentured to the distinguished surgeon Abraham Colles and commenced medical studies in the RCSI medical school. In 1818 Harrison was elected a member of RCSI. In 1817 he was appointed Demonstrator in RCSI and was elected Professor of Anatomy and Physiology in Trinity College Dublin in 1827. In 1824 he took the degree of M.B. and in 1837 that of M.D. He was appointed Professor of Anatomy and Chirurgery in the School of Physic in Trinity College Dublin in 1837.

He was a surgeon to Dr Steevens' Hospital and a consultant surgeon to Jervis Street Charitable Infirmary. Harrison was for many years one of the Honorary Secretaries to the Royal Dublin Society.

Harrison published Surgical Anatomy of the Arteries in two volumes in 1824 and it was considered a significant textbook at the time, running to five editions. This was followed by another textbook The Dublin Dissector Manual of Anatomy, later editions of which were published in London and New York.

See also
 List of presidents of the Royal College of Surgeons in Ireland

References

External links 

 Robert Harrison, Dictionary of Irish Biography, Royal Irish Academy

Presidents of the Royal College of Surgeons in Ireland
Irish surgeons
1796 births
1858 deaths